Half a World Away may refer to:
Half a World Away (album), a 2008 album by Hateful Monday
"Half a World Away" (song), a song by R.E.M. from the 1991 album Out of Time
"Half a World Away", a song by Esthero from the 1998 album Breath from Another
"Half a World Away" (Corin Tucker Band song), from the album 1,000 Years
Half a World Away (TV miniseries), a 1991 Australian TV miniseries about the 1934 MacRobertson Air Race

See also
"Half the World Away", a song by Oasis